Ivan Bisson  (born 21 April 1946) is a retired Italian professional basketball player.

Professional career
Bisson was a member of the FIBA European Selection, in 1975. He was a four time EuroLeague champion (1972, 1973, 1975, 1976).

National team career
Bisson was a part of the senior Italian national basketball teams that won bronze medals at the 1971 EuroBasket, and the 1975 EuroBasket. He also competed at the 1972 Summer Olympics, and the 1976 Summer Olympics, finishing in fourth and fifth place, respectively.

References

External links
FIBA Profile
FIBA Europe Profile
Italian League Profile 

1946 births
Living people
Italian men's basketball players
1970 FIBA World Championship players
Basketball players at the 1972 Summer Olympics
Basketball players at the 1976 Summer Olympics
Olympic basketball players of Italy
Pallacanestro Varese players
Power forwards (basketball)
Pallalcesto Amatori Udine players